Eugrammodes is a monotypic moth genus of the family Erebidae erected by George Hampson in 1926. Its only species, Eugrammodes esquina, was first described by Paul Dognin in 1897. It is found in Ecuador.

References

Calpinae
Monotypic moth genera